Bicyclus sambulos, the tailed bush brown, is a butterfly in the family Nymphalidae. It is found in Sierra Leone, Liberia, Ivory Coast, Ghana, Nigeria, Cameroon, Gabon, the Central African Republic, the Democratic Republic of the Congo, Uganda and Tanzania. The habitat consists of dense primary forests.

Adults are attracted to fermented bananas and sap oozing from trees.

Subspecies
Bicyclus sambulos sambulos (Nigeria, Cameroon, Gabon, Central African Republic, Democratic Republic of the Congo, western Tanzania)
Bicyclus sambulos cyaneus Condamin, 1961 (Uganda, north-western Tanzania)
Bicyclus sambulos unicolor Condamin, 1971 (Sierra Leone, Liberia, Ivory Coast, Ghana)

References

Elymniini
Butterflies described in 1877
Taxa named by William Chapman Hewitson
Butterflies of Africa